Alejandro Portes (born October 13, 1944) is a Cuban-American sociologist. He is a member of the National Academy of Sciences, the American Philosophical Society, and of the Board of Trustees and the Scientific Council at the IMDEA Social Sciences Institute. He also served as the president of the American Sociological Association in 1999. His academic studies have focused on immigration to the United States and factors affecting the fates of immigrants and their children. He has also done work on shack settlements in Latin America. His work is highly cited in the sub-fields of economic sociology, cultural sociology and race and ethnicity.

Career
Portes attended the University of Havana (1959–1960), Catholic University of Argentina, Buenos Aires (1963) and received his BA from Creighton University in 1965. He received his MA in 1967 and PhD in 1970 in sociology from the University of Wisconsin–Madison. Portes has held the John Dewey Chair in Arts and Science at Johns Hopkins University and the Emilio Bacardi distinguished professorship at the University of Miami. He has also previously taught at the University of Texas at Austin and Duke University. In 1993 his book ‘City on the Edge’ won awards for best book in urban and community sociology and in urban anthropology. In 2002, he received the Distinguished Scholarly Publication Award from the American Sociological Association for Legacies: The Story of the Immigrant Second Generation. In 2008, Portes was awarded the NAS Award for Scientific Reviewing from the National Academy of Sciences. He holds honorary degrees from The New School for Social Research, the University of Genoa  and the University of Wisconsin-Madison.

See also
 Wisconsin model

References

External links
Official profile from Princeton
America 2050: Immigration and the Hourglass (an essay by Portes)

American sociologists
Members of the United States National Academy of Sciences
Presidents of the American Sociological Association
American people of Cuban descent
1944 births
Living people
University of Wisconsin–Madison School of Education alumni
Princeton University faculty

Members of the American Philosophical Society